Las Dębowy  is a village in the administrative district of Gmina Łaziska, within Opole Lubelskie County, Lublin Voivodeship, in eastern Poland.

The village has an approximate population of 300.

References

Villages in Opole Lubelskie County